The matepe is a type of lamellophone played in North-Eastern Zimbabwe.  It is primarily played by the Sena Tonga and the Kore-Kore peoples which are subgroups of the Shona people.

It is one of the five main types of mbira played in Zimbabwe. The matepe is an umbrella term for many mbira-style instruments such as hera, matepe, and madhebhe. 

The matepe, according to Sekuru Chigamba, has soundboards that are made of wood from mutiti (Erythrina abyssinica) or mupepe (Commiphora marlothii) trees.

The matepe has a different playing style than other mbira in that it uses both thumbs and both index fingers. The keys are also thinner and longer compared to the mbira. Four or five independent melodies are played simultaneously in traditional matepe music.  The traditional music is used for spirit possession ceremonies, known in Zimbabwe as a bira ceremony.

The music is constituted by interlocking musical parts, creating rhythmic lines of great polyrhythmic intricacy and variety. The harmonic sequences upon which the music is based can be understood in fractal mathematical terms.

References 

Tracey, Andrew. (1970). The Matepe Mbira music of Rhodesia. J. African Music Society, 4:4, 37-61. Available at: International Library of African Music and

External links
Available recordings of the matepe: The International Library of African Music has many field recordings dating back to the mid-1950s. Those recordings are being rereleased on Roots World records.
 sympathetic-resonances.org: A free online platform featuring computer-generated playback and visualisation of mbira (including matepe) transcriptions, with the long-term goal of cultural preservation.
Chake Chawasarira: Magore-Kore.
Rattletree Matepe discussion forum (archived)

Comb lamellophones
Zimbabwean musical instruments